Heinz Wirtz (born 10 November 1953) is a German former professional footballer who played as a defender. He played professionally in the Bundesliga, the North American Soccer League, the Major Indoor Soccer League and American Professional Soccer League. He also coached in the National Professional Soccer League. He is a member of the Triple Nine Society.

Career
In 1981, Wirtz played for the Washington Diplomats of the North American Soccer League. In February 1982, he signed with the Baltimore Blast of the Major Indoor Soccer League. He would go on to play three seasons with the Blast and was inducted into the team's hall of fame in 2007. In November 1985, the Blast sold Wirtz' contract to the Chicago Sting for $5,000. He retired in 1988. In 1989, he played for the amateur Chicago Schwaben.  In 1990, he signed with the Orlando Lions of the American Professional Soccer League.

In the fall of 1990, he was hired to coach the Illinois Thunder of the National Professional Soccer League.

Honours
Fortuna Düsseldorf
 DFB-Pokal: 1979–80

Individual
 MISL All-Star Team: 1983, 1988
 All MISL Team - First team selection: 1983

References

External links

NASL/MISL stats

Living people
1953 births
German footballers
Association football defenders
Fortuna Düsseldorf players
Bundesliga players
American Professional Soccer League players
Major Indoor Soccer League (1978–1992) players
North American Soccer League (1968–1984) players
National Professional Soccer League (1984–2001) coaches
Washington Diplomats (NASL) players
Baltimore Blast (1980–1992) players
Chicago Schwaben players
Chicago Sting (MISL) players
Orlando Lions players
German football managers
German expatriate footballers
German expatriate sportspeople in the United States
Expatriate soccer players in the United States